Keratin, type II cytoskeletal 78 is a protein that in humans is encoded by the KRT78 gene.

This gene is a member of the type II keratin gene family and encodes a protein with an intermediate filament domain. Keratins are the major structural proteins in epithelial cells, forming a cytoplasmic network of 10 to 12 nm wide intermediate filaments and creating a scaffold that gives cells the ability to withstand mechanical and non-mechanical stresses. The genes of the type II keratin family are located as a gene cluster at 12p13.13. Four pseudogenes of this gene family have been identified.

References

Further reading